Alex Pearce (born 9 June 1995 in Ulverstone, Tasmania) is an Australian rules footballer who plays for the Fremantle Football Club in the Australian Football League (AFL). Pearce has served as Fremantle Captain since 2023.

Early career

Drafted with the 37th selection in the 2013 AFL draft from Devonport Football Club in the Tasmanian State League, he played most of his junior football as a key forward. However, after moving to Fremantle, he played mainly as a key defender for Peel Thunder in the West Australian Football League (WAFL), Fremantle's reserve team.

AFL career

Pearce made his AFL debut for Fremantle in Round 6 of the 2015 AFL season at Domain Stadium against Essendon, replacing the injured Luke McPharlin.   He was the first player to make his debut for Fremantle in 2015. He is not related to either of his former teammates who share his surname, Danyle Pearce and Clancee Pearce. Pearce suffered a broken leg late in the 2016 season and as a result missed the entire 2017 season. 

Ahead of the 2018 season, Pearce was elevated into Fremantle's leadership group. Pearce made his return for the Dockers in Round 1 of the 2018 AFL season during Fremantle's clash against Port Adelaide at Adelaide Oval. Pearce played 21 out of a possible 22 games in 2018, establishing himself as a key pillar in Fremantle's defensive structure.

Pearce started 2019 in astonishing fashion, and was considered to be in contention for All-Australian honours. However, he broke his ankle in the win against Collingwood at the MCG in Round 11 and was subsequently ruled out for the remainder of the season. 

Pearce missed the entire 2020 AFL season after complications with his recovery from a broken ankle sustained the season prior. 

Pearce would serve as Fremantle's stand-in captain for a large portion of the 2022 AFL season due to captain Nat Fyfe struggling with injury throughout the season. February 23 2023 saw Pearce appointed Fremantle Captain succeeding Nat Fyfe. 

Pearce is currently studying a Bachelor of Arts (Psychology) at Deakin University. In 2021, Pearce was named as Deakin University's Indigenous Sportsperson of the Year.

Statistics
 Statistics are correct to the end of round 10, 2022

|- style="background-color: #EAEAEA"
! scope="row" style="text-align:center" | 2014
|
| 25 || 0 || – || – || – || – || – || – || – || – || – || – || – || – || – || –
|-
! scope="row" style="text-align:center" | 2015
|
| 25 || 13 || 3 || 3 || 73 || 65 || 138 || 50 || 20 || 0.2 || 0.2 || 5.6 || 5.0 || 10.6 || 3.8 || 1.5
|- style="background-color: #EAEAEA"
! scope="row" style="text-align:center" | 2016
|
| 25 || 8 || 0 || 1 || 36 || 41 || 77 || 20 || 17 || 0.0 || 0.1 || 4.5 || 5.1 || 9.6 || 2.5 || 2.1
|-
! scope="row" style="text-align:center" | 2017
|
| 25 || 0 || – || – || – || – || – || – || – || – || – || – || – || – || – || –
|- style="background-color: #EAEAEA"
! scope="row" style="text-align:center" | 2018
|
| 25 || 21 || 0 || 0 || 109 || 118 || 227 || 72 || 36 || 0.0 || 0.0 || 5.2 || 5.6 || 10.8 || 3.4 || 1.7
|-
! scope="row" style="text-align:center" | 2019
|
| 25 || 11 || 0 || 0 || 56 || 63 || 119 || 36 || 24 || 0.0 || 0.0 || 5.1 || 5.7 || 10.8 || 3.3 || 2.2
|- style="background-color: #EAEAEA"
! scope="row" style="text-align:center" | 2020
|
| 25 || 0 || – || – || – || – || – || – || – || – || – || – || – || – || – || –
|-
! scope="row" style="text-align:center" | 2021
|
| 25 || 10 || 0 || 1 || 56 || 40 || 96 || 27 || 10 || 0.0 || 0.1 || 5.6 || 4.0 || 9.6 || 2.7 || 1.0
|- style="background-color: #EAEAEA"
! scope="row" style="text-align:center" | 2022
|
| 25 || 9 || 0 || 0 || 60 || 34 || 94 || 36 || 9 || 0.0 || 0.0 || 6.7 || 3.8 || 10.4 || 4.0 || 1.0
|- class="sortbottom"
! colspan=3| Career
! 72
! 3
! 5
! 390
! 361
! 751
! 241
! 116
! 0.0
! 0.1
! 5.4
! 5.0
! 10.4
! 3.3
! 1.6
|}

Notes

References

External links

WAFL Player Profile and Statistics

1995 births
Living people
Fremantle Football Club players
Peel Thunder Football Club players
Australian rules footballers from Tasmania
Indigenous Australian players of Australian rules football
People from Ulverstone, Tasmania
Devonport Football Club players